Giuseppe Frascaroli (born May 6, 1953) is an Italian neoclassical painter.

Life
Giuseppe Frascaroli was born on May 6, 1953 in Oltrepò Pavese, Italy. He later received a medical degree with a specialization in neurology. A neurologist by trade, he is also a neoclassical painter working in Italy.  He is a recipient of the Gold Italian Medal of Merit for Culture and Art, and was named a Knight of the Order of Merit of the Italian Republic, later promoted to the level of Officer.

Career
The Government of Italy has gifted Frascaroli paintings to foreign dignitaries including those from China and Monaco. At the 2013 Venice Biennale, his works were presented to the Government of Taiwan. Museums and collections that contain his works include the Museums and the Apostolic Palace of the Vatican, the Arsenal of Venice, the National Historical Museum of the Infantry in Rome, the Maronite Christian Church of "San Giorgio" in Beirut in Lebanon, the Naval History Museum in Venice, the Government Palace of the Republic of China in Taipei, the University of Genoa Delle Peschiere, the Stupa of Boudhanath in Kathmandu in Nepal, the Teatro alla Scala in Milan, the Cathedral of San Josè in Antigua Guatemala, the San Cristóbal de las Casas in Mexico, the Archbishopric Palaces of Krakow and Genoa, and the General Staff of the Navy of Italy. He is especially known for his portraits of Catholic Popes. There is also a permanent exhibition dedicated to his works in the Palazzo Belgioioso of Milan, which has dedicated a room to his career.

References

Living people
1953 births
20th-century Italian painters
21st-century Italian painters
Neoclassical painters
Italian neurologists
People from the Province of Pavia